Binbrook is a community in southeastern Hamilton, Ontario, in Canada. It was amalgamated into the city of Hamilton in 2001. Since 2001, hundreds of new homes have been built in Binbrook, separated from Hamilton by conservation and agricultural lands.

History
Armstrong's General Store was a longtime centre of community activity as was the feed mill. In the 1960s, Cybulski's Grocery Store became a hub for the small community. Knox Presbyterian Church, as well as a Baptist church, and Anglican Church all are near the centre of the village.

The community of Binbrook has a rich history of agriculture and First Nations peoples. There has been evidence found of Algonquin tribes inhabiting this area.

The first registry of Binbrook is in 1791 when it was called Township #11 in the District of Nassau. The plan can be found in the Department of Lands and Forests, Toronto, dated October 25, 1791, where it lists four concessions and blocks divided amongst several families.

Binbrook farmers' market, open seasonally, has become a highly anticipated event that highlights local growers and artisans. The Market takes place at the Fairgrounds which holds a special place in Canadian history as being the host of one of North America's oldest Fall fairs. The Fairgrounds and Agricultural Hall are home to many community events and lay at the centre of the community.

The Binbrook Little Theatre, which is across from the Agricultural hall, is home to local productions which highlight the creativity and culture of the area.  The theatre gives opportunities to those wanting to explore their acting potential on the stage, and puts on 3 productions a season.

The Hamilton Public Library opened the Binbrook branch in April 2018. The community also has a community centre, arena, soccer fields, and the Binbrook Conservation area.

As of July 2020 an LCBO opened in town, displacing the Binbrook Food Market as the town's long standing and only retail store selling alcohol.

Binbrook Conservation Area
The Binbrook Conservation Area is a 396-hectare (978 acre) tract of land owned and operated by the Niagara Peninsula Conservation Authority. Of this area, 174 hectares (430 acres) are covered by picturesque Lake Niapenco. The area was purchased by the NPCA in 1968. The lake was formed after completion of the dam that was built in 1971. The dam was built to augment the summer water flow in the Welland River and to provide seasonal flood control.

The lake is surrounded by open meadows, hardwood forests and reforested areas. At one time, there were campgrounds at the conservation area. The old campground access roads now provide the basis for many of the hiking trails at the Binbrook Conservation Area.  Recently the Park has had the addition of Wake Boarding offering area residents a chance to enjoy the surf at this otherwise, quiet and serene, lake.

Demography
The population of Binbrook was 8794 at the Canada 2016 Census. The continued growth has attracted many businesses to the area, including Freshco, Tim Hortons and Shoppers Drug Mart.

The community still has its roots in farming and new residents continue to support the local farming community while encouraging the vitality and growth of the village.

References

Neighbourhoods in Hamilton, Ontario